Marilena Vlădărău (born 16 August 1963) is a Romanian former artistic gymnast. In 1979, she was a member of the first Romanian team to win gold at the World Artistic Gymnastics Championships. She had previously won the silver medal with the Romanian team at the 1978 World Championships. After retirement, she worked as a coach.

References

Living people
Romanian female artistic gymnasts
Medalists at the World Artistic Gymnastics Championships
1963 births
20th-century Romanian women